Borungaboodie is an extinct genus of potoroo that lived in Southwest Australia during the Pleistocene. The genus is represented by a single species known as Borungaboodie hatcheri, or more informally, the giant potoroo.

Discovery and naming
Remains of Borungaboodie were found in Tight Entrance Cave in southwestern Australia. While the cave was explored since the 1970s, it wasn't until 1991 that Lindsay Hatcher and his team at the Western Australian Speleological Group (WASG) discovered that the cave contains fossils of extinct species. The first fossils of Borungaboodie were subsequently discovered in 1996.

The name Borungaboodie is derived from the Nyoongar borunga, meaning "very big", and boodie the word for the living bettong. The specific name honors Hatcher.

Description
Borungaboodie was significantly larger than any living potoroo, reaching a size comparable to that of a koala. Its lower jaw measured 30 percent greater than the living rufous bettong, and it was estimated to weigh almost . It also had very robust teeth and jaws. The impressive dentary features suggest that Borungaboodie was capable of generating a much higher bite force than its smaller relatives, and large size also suggests a possibly more omnivorous diet.

References

Prehistoric macropods
Pleistocene mammals of Australia
Pleistocene marsupials
Pleistocene extinctions